Impatiens johnsiana is a flowering plant species belonging to the family Balsaminaceae. It was discovered from Kattimattom Hills near Chembra Peak, Wayanad. The new plant has been named Impatiens johnsiana after John C. Jacob, who was popularly known as Johnci, an ardent naturalist who devoted his life to educate people on the need to conserve the biodiversity of the Western Ghats.

References

johnsiana
Plants described in 2012